In the mathematical field of topology, the Alexandroff extension is a way to extend a noncompact topological space by adjoining a single point in such a way that the resulting space is compact.  It is named after the Russian mathematician Pavel Alexandroff.
More precisely, let X be a topological space.  Then the Alexandroff extension of X is a certain compact space X* together with an open embedding c : X → X* such that the complement of X in X* consists of a single point, typically denoted ∞.  The map c is a Hausdorff compactification if and only if X is a locally compact, noncompact Hausdorff space.  For such spaces the Alexandroff extension is called the one-point compactification or Alexandroff compactification.  The advantages of the Alexandroff compactification lie in its simple, often geometrically meaningful structure and the fact that it is in a precise sense minimal among all compactifications; the disadvantage lies in the fact that it only gives a Hausdorff compactification on the class of locally compact, noncompact Hausdorff spaces, unlike the Stone–Čech compactification which exists for any topological space (but provides an embedding exactly for Tychonoff spaces).

Example: inverse stereographic projection 
A geometrically appealing example of one-point compactification is given by the inverse stereographic projection. Recall that the stereographic projection S gives an explicit homeomorphism from the unit sphere minus the north pole (0,0,1) to the Euclidean plane. The inverse stereographic projection  is an open, dense embedding into a compact Hausdorff space obtained by adjoining the additional point . Under the stereographic projection latitudinal circles  get mapped to planar circles . It follows that the deleted neighborhood basis of  given by the punctured spherical caps  corresponds to the complements of closed planar disks . This example already contains the key concepts of the general case.

Motivation 
Let  be an embedding from a topological space X to a compact Hausdorff topological space Y, with dense image and one-point remainder .  Then c(X) is open in a compact Hausdorff space so is locally compact Hausdorff, hence its homeomorphic preimage X is also locally compact Hausdorff.  Moreover, if X were compact then c(X) would be closed in Y and hence not dense. Thus a space can only admit a Hausdorff one-point compactification if it is locally compact, noncompact and Hausdorff.  Moreover, in such a one-point compactification the image of a neighborhood basis for x in X gives a neighborhood basis for c(x) in c(X), and—because a subset of a compact Hausdorff space is compact if and only if it is closed—the open neighborhoods of  must be all sets obtained by adjoining  to the image under c of a subset of X with compact complement.

The Alexandroff extension 

The inclusion map  is called the Alexandroff extension of X (Willard, 19A).

The properties below all follow from the above discussion:

 The space  is compact.
 The space  is Hausdorff if and only if X is Hausdorff and locally compact.
 The space  is T1 if and only if X is T1.

The one-point compactification 
In particular, the Alexandroff extension  is a Hausdorff compactification of X if and only if X is Hausdorff, noncompact and locally compact.  In this case it is called the one-point compactification or Alexandroff compactification of X.

Recall from the above discussion that any Hausdorff compactification with one point remainder is necessarily (isomorphic to) the Alexandroff compactification.

Let X be any noncompact Tychonoff space.  Under the natural partial ordering on the set  of equivalence classes of compactifications, any minimal element is equivalent to the Alexandroff extension (Engelking, Theorem 3.5.12).  It follows that a noncompact Tychonoff space admits a minimal compactification if and only if it is locally compact.

Non-Hausdorff one-point compactifications 
Let  be an arbitrary noncompact topological space.  One may want to determine all the compactifications (not necessarily Hausdorff) of  obtained by adding a single point, which could also be called one-point compactifications in this context.  

 The Alexandroff extension of  defined above.
 The open extension topology.
 Any topology intermediate between the two topologies above.

Further examples

Compactifications of discrete spaces
 The one-point compactification of the set of positive integers is homeomorphic to the space consisting of K = {0} U {1/n | n is a positive integer} with the order topology.
Here  has the discrete topology.
 Polyadic spaces are defined as topological spaces that are the continuous image of the power of a one-point compactification of a discrete, locally compact Hausdorff space.

Compactifications of continuous spaces
 The one-point compactification of n-dimensional Euclidean space Rn is homeomorphic to the n-sphere Sn.  As above, the map can be given explicitly as an n-dimensional inverse stereographic projection.
 Since the closure of a connected subset is connected, the Alexandroff extension of a noncompact connected space is connected.  However a one-point compactification may "connect" a disconnected space: for instance the one-point compactification of the disjoint union of a finite number  of copies of the interval (0,1) is a wedge of  circles.
 The one-point compactification of the disjoint union of a countable number of copies of the interval (0,1) is the Hawaiian earring.  This is different from the wedge of countably many circles, which is not compact.
Recall that the definition of the smash product: where  is the wedge sum, and again, / denotes the quotient space.

As a functor 
In particular, homeomorphic spaces have isomorphic Alexandroff extensions.

See also

Notes

References 
 
 

 
 
 
 
 

General topology
Compactification (mathematics)